Donald Clair McDowell (August 27, 1890 – February 22, 1973) was a member of the Wisconsin State Assembly.

Biography
McDowell was born on August 27, 1890, in Mount Sterling, Wisconsin, the son of assemblyman Archie J. McDowell. During World War I, he served in the United States Army. He died in 1973 and is buried in Soldiers Grove, Wisconsin.

Political career
McDowell was a member of the Assembly from 1937 to 1948. He was chosen as speaker of the Assembly in 1945. He was also a delegate to the 1944 Republican National Convention.

References

External links

People from Mount Sterling, Wisconsin
Republican Party members of the Wisconsin State Assembly
Military personnel from Wisconsin
United States Army personnel of World War I
United States Army soldiers
1890 births
1973 deaths
20th-century American politicians